The 1924 All-Ireland Senior Football Championship Final was the 37th All-Ireland Final and the deciding match of the 1924 All-Ireland Senior Football Championship, an inter-county Gaelic football tournament for the top teams in Ireland.

Match

Summary
The Hogan Stand and a new scoreboard were unveiled at Croke Park for this final. Con Brosnan scored the winning point.

Dublin would not win another All-Ireland football title until 1942.

It was the first of three All-Ireland football titles won by Kerry in the 1920s, which made them joint "team of the decade" with Dublin who also won three.

Details

References

All-Ireland Senior Football Championship Final
All-Ireland Senior Football Championship Final, 1924
All-Ireland Senior Football Championship Finals
Dublin county football team matches
Kerry county football team matches